Robert William Griffith (October 7, 1906 – October 21, 1960) was an American politician. He was a member of the Arkansas House of Representatives, serving from 1939 to 1946. He was a member of the Democratic party.

References

1960 deaths
1906 births
20th-century American politicians
Politicians from North Little Rock, Arkansas
Speakers of the Arkansas House of Representatives
Democratic Party members of the Arkansas House of Representatives